For the 2001 ISSF World Cup in the seventeen Olympic shooting events, the World Cup Final was held in August 2001 in Munich, Germany for the rifle, pistol and running target events, and in January 2002 in Doha, Qatar for the shotgun events. The shotgun final was originally planned for November 2001 but was rescheduled after the September 11, 2001 attacks, leading to the first time ever a World Cup season overflowed into the next calendar year.

Rifle, pistol and running target
The winners in Munich were:
  Artem Khadjibekov, Russia, in men's 50 m Rifle Three Positions
  Jonas Edman, Sweden, in men's 50 m Rifle Prone
  Qiu Jian, China, in men's 10 m Air Rifle
  Mikhail Nestruev, Russia, in men's 50 m Pistol
  Ji Haiping, China, in men's 25 m Rapid Fire Pistol
  Franck Dumoulin, France, in men's 10 m Air Pistol
  Manfred Kurzer, Germany, in men's 10 m Running Target
  Shan Hong, China, in women's 50 m Rifle Three Positions
  Sonja Pfeilschifter, Germany, in women's 10 m Air Rifle
  Tao Luna, China, in women's 25 m Pistol
  Ren Jie, China, in women's 10 m Air Pistol

Shotgun
The winners in the delayed Doha competition were:
  Giovanni Pellielo, Italy, in men's Trap
  Walton Eller, United States, in men's Double Trap
  Ennio Falco, Italy, in men's Skeet
  Taeko Takeba, Japan, in women's Trap
  Deborah Gelisio, Italy, in women's Double Trap
  Wei Ning, China, in women's Skeet

ISSF World Cup
World Cup
2001 in German sport
2002 in Qatari sport
2000s in Munich
21st century in Doha
Sports competitions in Doha
Sports competitions in Munich
Shooting competitions in Germany
Shooting competitions in Qatar
August 2001 sports events in Europe